The America East Conference is a collegiate  athletic conference affiliated with NCAA Division I whose members are located in the  Northeastern United States.

Founded in 1979, the conference has nine core members including eight  public  research universities, three of which: the University of Maine, the University of New Hampshire, and the University of Vermont, are the flagship universities of their states. Two non-flagship university centers of the State University of New York, the  University at Albany and Binghamton University, 
are in the conference along with  UMass Lowell,  NJIT and Bryant University. Of the nine core members, eight are located within the borders of 7 contiguous states.  The ninth,  UMBC, is the only institution outside this bloc of states. Bryant is the latest institution to join the conference in 2022, when Stony Brook University and the University of Hartford departed the conference. It is the only private university among the core members.

The America East Conference sponsors 18 sports (8 men's and 10 women's). The conference is among the best in the country according to Graduation Success Rate (GSR) data released by the NCAA.

History

The America East Conference was founded as the Eastern College Athletic Conference-North, a men's basketball-only athletic conference in 1979. The conference was known as the Eastern College Athletic Conference-North from 1979 to 1988 and the North Atlantic Conference from 1988 to 1996. The charter members were the University of Rhode Island, the College of the Holy Cross, Canisius College, Niagara University, Colgate University, Northeastern University, Boston University, the University of Maine, the University of New Hampshire and the University of Vermont. 
The America East Conference made history during the 2018 NCAA Division I men's basketball tournament on March 16, 2018, when No. 16 seed UMBC defeated No. 1 seed Virginia, marking the first time in men's tournament history that a No. 1 seed had lost to a No. 16 seed.

Many other events have occurred since its formation:
 Rhode Island left in 1980.
 Holy Cross left in 1983.
 Siena College joined in 1984.
 The University of Hartford joined in 1985.
 Later, the conference became an all-sports conference, named as the North Atlantic Conference in the 1988–89 season, only for Canisius, Niagara and Siena to leave after the spring of 1989 to join the Metro Atlantic Athletic Conference (MAAC).
 Colgate left in 1990 to join the Patriot League.
 The University of Delaware and Drexel University joined in 1991.
 Hofstra University joined in 1994.
 Towson University joined in 1995.
 On July 1, 1996, the conference's name changed to its present name, the America East Conference.
 During 2001, Delaware, Drexel, Hofstra and Towson left to join the Colonial Athletic Association (CAA) while the University at Albany, Binghamton University and Stony Brook University replaced them.
 The University of Maryland, Baltimore County (UMBC) soon joined in 2003.
 Northeastern left in 2005 to join the CAA.
 Boston University left to join the Patriot League on July 1, 2013, while the University of Massachusetts Lowell joined from Division II.
 In 2020, New Jersey Institute of Technology (NJIT) joined from the ASUN Conference.
 In March 2022, Bryant University accepted an invitation to join the America East Conference, leaving the Northeast Conference. This move took effect on July 1.
 Also on July 1, 2022, Stony Brook University left to join the all-sports Colonial Athletic Association; it had been a member of the CAA's technically separate football arm, CAA Football, since 2013. Then-current field hockey associate Monmouth left to join the CAA, whose all-sports league sponsors that sport.
 In 2022, the University of Hartford left the conference during its transition down to Division III. At the time this move was announced, the school's departure from the conference had been planned for 2023, but this was eventually changed to 2022.

On May 6, 2021, Hartford's governing board voted to begin the process of transitioning the school from Division I to NCAA Division III. Under the plan, Hartford would formally apply to the NCAA for reclassification in January 2022, stop awarding athletic scholarships to incoming students from 2022–23 forward, and join an as-yet-undetermined D-III conference in 2023 before becoming a full D-III member in 2025–26.

Several media reports indicated that Hartford's last year in the American East Conference would be the 2021–22 season.
 This was confirmed on June 21, 2022, when the Commonwealth Coast Conference (CCC) announced that it would be Hartford's partner in the school's reclassification process, with the Hawks joining that league effective in 2023–24. Hartford will play most of its sports in the 2022–23 season as a D-I independent.

At the time, Hartford was the only private university in the conference; this status transferred to Bryant when it joined in July 2022.

On July 20, 2022, Merrimack College was announced to join the conference as a men's lacrosse member for the 2022–23 season.

Members

Current members

Associate members
Five schools currently hold associate membership: three from California, one from Virginia and one from Massachusetts.

Notes

Former members

Former associate members
Five schools have had single-sport membership in the past. Three of these, Fairfield, Monmouth, and Providence, moved their America East sports into their all-sports conferences. Another such school, NJIT, left when it joined a conference that sponsored its America East sport, but returned as a full member in July 2020 (by which time the AmEast had dropped that sport). Pacific dropped its America East sport following the 2018–19 academic year due to budget cuts.

Membership timeline

Facilities

Sports sponsored
The America East Conference sponsors championship competition in eight men's and ten women's NCAA sanctioned sports. The most recent changes to the roster of America East sports were announced in 2016, with the dropping of women's tennis after the 2015–16 season due to a lack of sponsoring teams and the revival of men's swimming and diving effective in the 2017–18 school year.

Men's sports

Notes

Women's sports

Notes

NCAA team championships

No America East school has won a national title in a sport sponsored by the conference; however, member institutions have been national champions in non-America East sports.

Men's basketball

All-time school record by winning percentage
This list goes through the 2018–19 season.

List of regular season champions

List of tournament champions

No. 16 UMBC upset of No. 1 Virginia

During the 2018 NCAA tournament, UMBC became the first No. 16 seed to defeat a No. 1 seed in the NCAA men's tournament, beating the Virginia Cavaliers 74–54.

Women's basketball

All-time school record by winning percentage

List of regular season champions

List of tournament champions

Lacrosse

Soccer

See also
 List of America East Conference champions
 America East Conference baseball tournament

References

External links
 

 
Northeastern United States
Sports in the Eastern United States
Sports organizations established in 1979
Articles which contain graphical timelines